Scyrotis kochi is a species of moth of the  family Cecidosidae. It is found in South Africa.

References

Endemic moths of South Africa
Cecidosidae
Moths of Africa